Nabatake Site is an archaeological site that located in Karatsu, Saga of Japan. The site was designated as a National Historic Site of Japan in 1983. It is the oldest paddy field site in Japan, about 2500 to 2600 years ago, that can be confirmed at present.

It is acclaimed as the first Paddy field, important for the understanding of the evolution of wet-rice agricultural technology, and is the focus of the Matsurokan exhibition hall.

References

External links 

Karatsu, Saga
Historic Sites of Japan